In population genetics, the Balding–Nichols model is a statistical description of the allele frequencies in the components of a sub-divided population. With background allele frequency p the allele frequencies, in sub-populations separated by Wright's FST F, are distributed according to independent draws from

where B is the Beta distribution. This distribution has mean p and variance Fp(1 – p).

The model is due to David Balding and Richard Nichols and is widely used in the forensic analysis of DNA profiles and in population models for genetic epidemiology.

References

 

Statistical genetics
Population genetics
Continuous distributions